The Severn River railway bridge is a heritage-listed railway bridge that carries the Main Northern line across the Severn River at Dundee, Glen Innes Severn, New South Wales, Australia. It was designed by John Whitton in his capacity as Engineer-in-Chief for Railways and built in 1886. It is also known as Severn River Railway Viaduct. The property is owned by RailCorp, an agency of the Government of New South Wales. It was added to the New South Wales State Heritage Register on 2 April 1999.

History 
When John Whitton, Engineer-in-Chief for Railways 1856-1890, extended the Main North Railway from Muswellbrook to Glen Innes, 1870-1884 it climbed through the highest parts of the Great Dividing Range into the New England Region. Gradients were steep, curves were sharp, there was heavy earthworks and some major iron lattice bridges. It was expensive railway construction.

When the section from Glen Innes to Tenterfield was planned, economies were made, particularly with bridges. They had to be timber, mostly ballast top timber beam bridges but at three locations larger bridges were required, over the Beardy Waters, Severn River and Bluff River.

Whitton, a successful railway engineer from England, chose one of Isambard Kingdom Brunel's timber bridge viaducts built in Cornwall during the 1850s. The model chosen was the St Germans Viaduct, composed of composite deck Queen post trusses, with the bottom chords being large iron rods. Whitton's staff redesigned the trusses to be all timber and the viaducts were built during construction of the Glen Innes to Tenterfield section 1884-86.

The final section to Wallangarra (1888) was mostly easier over plateau country but the crossing of Tenterfield Creek required a large bridge and a timber Queen post truss viaduct was built there also, the fourth between Glen Innes and the Queensland border.

All four viaducts retain their original fabric.

Only two other such timber viaducts were built in this period, the Ingalara Creek railway bridge and the Bredbo River railway bridge on the Bombala railway line.

Description 
Located  from Central station, the Severn River bridge is a 13-span timber truss viaduct; each span is  centre-to-centre of timber trestles.

The trusses are deck Queen post copied from one of Brunel's Cornish timber bridges (St Germans), built about 30 years earlier.

The condition of the bridge was assessed as fair as at 16 March 2006 due to lack of maintenance since rail services were suspended.

Heritage listing 
The Severn River railway bridge was listed on the New South Wales State Heritage Register on 2 April 1999 having satisfied the following criteria.

The place is important in demonstrating the course, or pattern, of cultural or natural history in New South Wales.

The timber Queen post truss viaduct was an economic bridge for the Glen Innes to Wallangarra Railway at a time when the boom years of the 1880s was ending and funding for railway construction was decreasing.

The place is important in demonstrating aesthetic characteristics and/or a high degree of creative or technical achievement in New South Wales.

Despite a degree of inaccessibility, the timber viaducts over the Beardy, Severn and Bluff Rivers are impressive structures within their rural landscapes. At Tenterfield, the adjacent New England Highway provides easy viewing of the fourth such viaduct.

The place has strong or special association with a particular community or cultural group in New South Wales for social, cultural or spiritual reasons.

The Main North Railway made a significant contribution to the development of the New England Region from the time of its construction 1882-88, and the four timber viaducts were important items of the railway's infrastructure.

The place has potential to yield information that will contribute to an understanding of the cultural or natural history of New South Wales.

The timber Queen post deck viaduct was a significant structure in place of the expensive iron lattice bridges preferred by John Whitton. The viaducts were technically sound and durable, having been built from renowned ironbark hardwood.

The place possesses uncommon, rare or endangered aspects of the cultural or natural history of New South Wales.

These four viaducts and the two on the Cooma Line are the only ones of their type built. They are a unique class of railway bridge.

See also 

List of railway bridges in New South Wales

References

Bibliography

Attribution 

New South Wales State Heritage Register
Railway bridges in New South Wales
Articles incorporating text from the New South Wales State Heritage Register
Main North railway line, New South Wales
1886 establishments in Australia
Bridges completed in 1886
Works of John Whitton
Queen post truss bridges
Wooden bridges in Australia
Former railway bridges in Australia
Viaducts in Australia